Thomas M. Hansen (born August 28, 1939) is an American former politician. He served in the South Dakota House of Representatives from 2001 to 2002 and in the Senate from 2002 to 2012.

References

1939 births
Living people
Politicians from Sioux Falls, South Dakota
Republican Party members of the South Dakota House of Representatives
Republican Party South Dakota state senators
People from Huron, South Dakota